The Hashmallim (חַשְׁמַלִּים Ḥašmallīm; sing. Hashmal, חַשְׁמַל Ḥašmal) are angelic entities in Judaism.

The word hashmal appears in the Hebrew Bible in Ezekiel 1:4-5:

Hashmallim occupy the fourth rank of ten in Maimonides's exposition of the Jewish angelic hierarchy.

The Septuagint translates hashmal to ηλεκτρον (elektron), which means "amber" in English. Later, hashmal became the Modern Hebrew word that translates to the English word "electricity." Jewish poet Judah Leib Gordon coined the modern Hebrew word, in his 1878 collection Gabashta.

See also
 List of angels in theology
 Merkabah mysticism

References

Angels in Judaism
Classes of angels